The Miami Short Film Festival is an annual film festival held in Miami, Florida, United States.  The festival was established in 2002 by William Vela, and takes place around the second and third week of November.  It was created to make a connection between established studios, independent filmmakers, and the global creative community, as well as to honor excellence in the art of filmmaking.

The festival presents awards for:
 Best of Fest
 Best Foreign Film
 Best Animation
 Best Experimental
 Best Documentary
 Best Narrative
 Best Environmental
 Best Local

References

External links
 

Festivals in Miami
Short film festivals in the United States
Film festivals in Florida
Film festivals established in 2002
2002 establishments in Florida